Alexandre Koyré (born Alexandr Vladimirovich (or Volfovich) Koyra; 29 August 1892 – 28 April 1964), also anglicized as Alexander Koyre, was a French philosopher of Russian origin who wrote on the history and philosophy of science.

Life
Koyré was born in the city of Taganrog, Russia on 29 August 1892 into a Jewish family. His original name was Alexandr Vladimirovich (or Volfovich) Koyra. In Imperial Russia he studied in Tiflis, Rostov-on-Don and Odessa, before pursuing his studies abroad.

At Göttingen, Germany (1908–1911) he studied under Edmund Husserl and David Hilbert. Husserl did not approve of Koyré's dissertation, whereupon Koyré left for Paris, to study at the Collège de France and the Sorbonne during the period 1912–1913 under Bergson, Brunschvicg, Lalande, Delbos and Picavet. Following Husserl's Cartesian Meditations, a series of lectures given in Paris in February 1929 (and one of the more important of Husserl's later works), Koyré met again with Husserl repeatedly.

In 1914 he joined the French Foreign Legion as soon as the war broke out. In 1916 he volunteered for a Russian regiment fighting on the Russian front, following a cooperation agreement between the French and Russian governments.

In 1922 Koyré completed his two State doctorate (then called Doctorat ès lettres) theses. The same year he started teaching in Paris at the École pratique des hautes études (EPHE), and became a colleague of Alexandre Kojève, who eventually replaced him as lecturer on Hegel. In 1931, he helped found the philosophical journal Recherches philosophiques. In 1932 the EPHE created a Department of History of Religious Thought in Modern Europe for him to chair. He retained this position until his death.

During the years 1932–34, 1936–38, and 1940–41, Koyré taught in Fuad University (later Cairo University) where, along with André Lalande and others, he introduced the study of modern philosophy to Egyptian academia. His most important student in Cairo was Abdel Rahman Badawi (1917–2002) who is considered the first systematic modern Arab philosopher. Koyré later joined the Egyptian National Committee of the Free French.

During World War II, Koyré lived in New York City, and taught at the New School for Social Research, including a course on Plato's Theaetetus, together with Leo Strauss and Kurt Riezler, in the fall of 1944.  After World War II, he was a frequent visitor to the United States, spending half a year at the Institute for Advanced Study at Princeton each year from 1955 to 1962 and also teaching as a visiting professor at Harvard, Yale, the University of Chicago, the University of Wisconsin, and Johns Hopkins.  His lectures at Johns Hopkins would form the nucleus of one of his best known publications, From the Closed World to the Infinite Universe (1957).

He died in Paris on 28 April 1964.

Work

Though best known as a philosopher of science, Koyré started out as a historian of religion. Much of his originality for the period rests on his ability to ground his studies of modern science on the history of religion and metaphysics.

Koyré focused on Galileo, Plato and Isaac Newton. His most famous work is From the Closed World to the Infinite Universe, a series of lectures given at Johns Hopkins University in 1959 on the rise of early modern science and the change of scientists' perception of the world during the period from Nicholas of Cusa and Giordano Bruno through Newton. Though the book has been widely heralded, it was a summation of Koyré's perspective rather than an original new work.

Koyré was suspicious of scientists' claims to prove natural or fundamental truths through experiments. He argued these experiments were based on complicated premises, and that they tended to prove the outlook behind these premises, rather than any real truth. He repeatedly critiqued Galileo's experiments, claiming that some of them could not have taken place, and disputed the results Galileo claimed and which modern historians of science had hitherto accepted.

According to Koyré, it was not the experimental or empirical nature of Galileo's and Newton's discoveries that carried the Scientific Revolution of the 16th and 17th centuries, but a shift in perspective, a change in theoretical outlook toward the world. Koyré strongly criticised what he called the "positivist" notion that science should only discover given phenomena, the relations between them and certain laws that would help to describe or predict them. To Koyré science was, at its heart, theory: an aspiration to know the truth of the world, of uncovering the essential structures from which phenomena, and the basic laws that relate them, spring.

Koyré was also interested in the correlations between scientific discoveries and religious or philosophical world views. Like Edmund Husserl in his later studies, Koyré claimed that modern science had succeeded in overcoming the split, inherent in traditional Aristotelian science, between Earth and Space, since these were now both seen as governed by the same laws. On the other hand, another split had now been created, between the phenomenal world inhabited by man and the purely abstract, mathematical world of science. Koyré aimed to show how this "first world", the world of human dwelling (personal and historical), apparently irrelevant to modern naturalistic research, was by no means irrelevant for the very constitution and development of this research. Koyré consistently sought to show how scientific truth is always discovered in correlation with specific historical, even purely personal, circumstances.

Koyré's work can be seen as a systematic analysis of the constitutive achievements that resulted in scientific knowledge, but with particular emphasis on the historical, and specifically human, circumstances that generate the scientists' phenomenal world and serve as foundation for all scientific constitutions of meaning.

Koyré influenced major European and American philosophers of science, most significantly Thomas Kuhn, Imre Lakatos, Michel Foucault and Paul Feyerabend.

Criticism 

In the course of his studies of Galileo, Koyré famously claimed that the experiments with weights falling and rolling on inclined planes that Galileo described in his writings probably had not been carried out in practice, but were instead thought experiments intended to illustrate his deductions.  Koyré argued that the precision of the results reported by Galileo was not possible with the technology available to him and quoted the contemporary judgement of Marin Mersenne, who had questioned the feasibility of reproducing Galileo's results.  Furthermore, according to Koyré, Galileo's science was largely a product of his Platonist philosophy and did not really derive from experimental observations.

Koyré's conclusions were first challenged in 1961 by Thomas B. Settle, who as a graduate student at Cornell University succeeded in reproducing Galileo's experiments with inclined planes using the methods and technologies described in Galileo's writing.  Later, Stillman Drake and others worked through Galileo's notes and demonstrated that Galileo was a careful experimentalist whose observations did play a pivotal role in the development of his scientific system that he later claimed in his published work. Koyré has been further criticised for his claim about Galileo's Platonism, which he saw as a synonym with mathematics and mathematization of nature. As the Italian scholar Lodovico Geymonat has proved, in fact, Platonism as a tradition does not helpfully illuminate the development of Galileo's mathematical studies which are mostly concerned with applied mathematics, engineering and mechanics fields that neither Plato nor Platonist authors were much interested in.

Writings (selection)
 La Philosophie de Jacob Boehme, Paris, J. Vrin, 1929.
 Études galiléennes, Paris: Hermann, 1939
 From the Closed World to the Infinite Universe, Baltimore: Johns Hopkins Press, 1957
 La Révolution astronomique: Copernic, Kepler, Borelli, Paris: Hermann, 1961
 The Astronomical Revolution Methuen, London, 1973
 Introduction à la lecture de Platon, Paris: Gallimard, 1994
 Metaphysics & Measurement: Essays in Scientific Revolution  Harvard University Press, 1968
 A Documentary History of the Problem of Fall from Kepler to Newton, pp. 329–395, Transactions of the American Philosophical Society, Vol. 45, 1955
 Newtonian Studies, Chapman & Hall, 1965

Honours
 General Secretary and Vice President, Institut International de Philosophie
 Member, American Academy of Arts and Sciences
 Sarton Medal, History of Science Society
 CNRS Silver Medal, Centre National de la Recherche Scientifique

References
 Jean-François Stoffel, Bibliographie d'Alexandre Koyré, Firenze : L.S. Olschki, 2000. 
 Marlon Salomon. "Alexandre Koyré, historiador do pensamento". Goiânia: Almeida & Clément, Brazil, 2010.

External links

 Alexandre Koyré's Online Archives Project (papers, manuscripts, notes, etc.) established by Center Alexandre- KOYRE/CRHST in partnership with CN2SV/CNRS)
 Mailing list about Alexandre Koyré's archives : A mailing list about A. Koyré archives
 Center Alexandre-KOYRE/CRHST, history of science and technologies center (Paris, France) supported by CNRS, EHESS, Cité des Sciences et de l'Industrie and Muséum National d'Histoire Naturelle.
 The Alexandre Koyre Prize at the International Academy of the History of Science.

Notes

1892 births
1964 deaths
20th-century essayists
20th-century French non-fiction writers
20th-century French philosophers
20th-century French historians
20th-century Russian philosophers
Continental philosophers
Epistemologists
French male essayists
French male non-fiction writers
French people of Russian-Jewish descent
Historians of philosophy
French historians of religion
Historians of science
Emigrants from the Russian Empire to France
Jewish philosophers
Metaphysicians
Metaphysics writers
Newton scholars
Ontologists
Academic staff of Cairo University
Phenomenologists
Philosophers of history
Philosophers of religion
Philosophers of science
19th-century Jews from the Russian Empire
Russian male essayists
Russian male writers
Soldiers of the French Foreign Legion
University of Paris alumni